Amergin, also spelled Amorgen, Amairgin, Aimhirghin, Amorghain, may refer to:

Amergin Glúingel, poet and druid of the Irish Mythological Cycle
Amergin mac Eccit, poet and hero of the Irish Ulster Cycle
Amergin of Maigh Seóla ( 550), father of Finbarr of Cork, Ireland
Amergin, a crater on Europa